The Habitats Directive (more formally known as Council Directive 92/43/EEC on the Conservation of natural habitats and of wild fauna and flora) is a directive adopted by the European Community in 1992 as a response to the Berne Convention. The European Community was reformed as the European Union the following year, but the directive is still recognised.

The Habitats Directive required national governments to specify areas that are expected to be ensuring the conservation of flora and fauna species. This led to the setting up of a network of protected areas across the EU, along with 'Special Areas of Conservation', which together with the existing Special Protection Areas, became the so-called Natura 2000 network established to protect species and habitats. 

This directive is one of the main pillars of the European Union's system of wildlife and nature conservation, another being the Birds Directive. The Habitats Directive, together with the Birds Directive, are also called the "nature directives".

The Habitats Directive consists of 24 articles of legislation to which all member states must comply. Article 17 of the directive sets the terms and standards for reporting on both the habitats and species listed in the annexes by the individual EU member countries. It stipulates a report from each member country on the state of nature every six years. The first preliminary reports were due in 2001 (but only published in 2004), the first actual assessments were due in 2007 (published 2009), the second in 2013 (published 2015), and the third set of assessment reports were due in 2019 (published 2020). The assessments of conservation status differ markedly from those of the IUCN Red List. The aim in the case of the EU conservation status is to assess the distance from a defined favourable situation, as opposed to the distance from extinction. There are three classes of conservation status: favourable (FV), unfavourable-inadequate (U1) and unfavourable-bad (U2).

The annexes of the directive outline the protected habitats and species: 
Annex I covers habitats, 
Annex II species requiring designation of Special Areas of Conservation, 
Annex IV species in need of strict protection, and 
Annex V species in which member countries may decide for themselves how to manage the population.

History

From 1988 to 1992, the policy was given importance at the national level by policy experts, scientists and ecologists; later on in the 1990s this spawned further political, social and administrative discussions among the relevant countries.

Due to differences in nature conservation traditions, national problems have arisen in the implementation of the directive. Since member states in the south and east of Europe participated less in nature policies, these states experienced problems with the EU provisions. In Germany, Austria, Italy and Belgium, the observation of conflicts between various government layers have caused prolonged delays in the management of nature policies. On the other hand, in member states such as the United Kingdom and Sweden, positive outcomes have developed due to stakeholder involvement, pro-active authorities, agencies responsible for implementation and public participation.

According to one 2014 report there are increasing incompatibilities with the Natura 2000 policy on economic development.

Annex I
Annex I lists the specific habitats which have been designated as the a Special Area of Conservation, to which a common EU-wide legislation applies. Certain habitats among those are furthermore designated as "priority habitat types". Habitats in the EU are given codes. An area or habitat can combine two habitats, and be designated as for example code 35.2 × 64.1 - Open grassland with Corynephorus and Agrostis (35.2), in combination with continental dunes (64.1). Example Annex I habitats are: 

Open sea and tidal areas
Sea cliffs and shingle or stony beaches
Atlantic and continental salt marshes and salt meadows
Mediterranean and thermo-Atlantic salt marshes and salt meadows
Salt and gypsum continental steppes
Dunes
Sea dunes of the Mediterranean coast
Continental dunes, old and decalcified
Standing and running freshwater
Sections of water courses with natural or semi-natural dynamics (minor, average and major beds) where the water quality shows no significant deterioration
Matorral
Mediterranean arborescent matorral
Thermo-Mediterranean and pre-steppe brush
Phrygana
Grasslands
Natural grasslands
Semi-natural dry grasslands and scrubland facies
Sclerophyllous grazed forests (dehesas)
Semi-natural tall-herb humid meadows
Mesophile grasslands
Bogs, mires and fens
Sphagnum acid bogs
Calcareous fens
Rocky areas and caves
Scree, chasmophytic vegetation on rocky slopes
Other rocky habitats
Forests - Only (sub-)natural
Forests of temperate Europe
Mediterranean deciduous forests
Mediterranean sclerophyllous forests
Alpine and subalpine coniferous forests
Mediterranean mountainous coniferous forests
The full list of habitats is distributed over 9 main categories.

Annex II
Annex II lists species which determine if an area is a Special Area of Conservation. These include:

Animals

Mammals
Pyrenean desman (Galemys pyrenaicus) 
Bats: Rhinolophus blasii, R. euryale, R. ferrumequinum, R. hipposideros, R. mehelyi, Barbastella barbastellus, Miniopterus schreibersi, Myotis bechsteini, M. blythi, M. capaccinii, M. dasycneme, M. emarginatus, M. myotis
Rodents: Spermophilus citellus, Castor fiber, Microtus cabrerae
Carnivores: Lynx (Lynx lynx), otter (Lutra lutra) and Mustela lutreola
Grey seal and harbour seal
natural populations of wild goats (Capra aegagrus)
natural populations of wild sheep (Ovis ammon musimon) on Corsica and Sardinia.
Rupicapra rupicapra balcanica
the dolphin Tursiops truncatus and the harbour porpoise Phocoena phocoena

Reptiles and amphibians
Land tortoises: Testudo hermanni, T. graeca and T. marginata
Freshwater turtles: Emys orbicularis, Mauremys caspica and M. leprosa
Lizards: Lacerta monticola, L. schreiberi, Gallotia galloti insulanagae, Podarcis lilfordi, P. pityusensis, Chalcides occidentalis (a skink) and Phyllodactylus europaeus (a gecko)
Snakes: Elaphe quatuorlineata, E. situla and Vipera ursinii
Salamanders: Chioglossa lusitanica, Mertensiella luschani, Salamandrina terdigitata, Triturus cristatus, olm (Proteus anguinus), Speleomantes ambrosii, S. flavus, S. genei, S. imperialis and S. supramontes 
Toads: Bombina bombina and B. variegata
Frogs: Rana latastei, Discoglossus jeanneae, D. montalentii and D. sardus

Fish
All Eudontomyzon species, Lampetra fluviatilis, L. planeri, Lethenteron zanandrai, Petromyzon marinus
Aphanius iberus and A. fasciatus
only natural populations of Hucho hucho
only freshwater populations of salmon (Salmo salar), the trout S. marmoradus and S. macrostigma
the cyprid fish Alburnus vulturius, A. albidus, Anaecypris hispanica, Aspius aspius, Barbus plebejus, B. meridionalis, B. capito, B. comiza, Chalcalburnus chalcoides, Chondrostoma soetta, Ch. polylepis, Ch. genei, Ch. lusitanicum, Ch. toxostoma, Gobio albipinnatus, G. uranoscopus, Iberocypris palaciosi, Leuciscus lucomonis, L. souffia, all species of Phoxinellus, Rutilus pigus, R. rubilio, R. arcasii, R. macrolepidotus, R. lemmingii, R. friesii meidingeri, R. alburnoides, Rhodeus sericeus amarus, Scardinius graecus
the Cobitidae loaches Cobitis conspersa, C. larvata, C. trichonica, C. taenia, Misgurnis fossilis, Sabanejewia aurata
of the perches: Gymnocephalus schraetzer and all Zingel species except Z. asper and Z. zingel
Gobiidae: Pomatoschistus canestrini, Padogobius panizzai, P. nigricans
the freshwater sculpins Cottus ferruginosus, C. gobio, C. petiti
all Alosa species, the river herrings or scads.
Aristotle's catfish (Silurus aristotelis)

Crustaceans
the freshwater crayfish Austropotamobius pallipes

Insects
the beetles Buprestis splendens, Cerambyx cerdo, Cucujus cinnaberinus,  Dytiscus latissimus, Graphoderus bilineatus, Limoniscus violaceus, Lucanus cervus and Morimus funereus
the butterflies Coenonympha oedippus, Erebia calcaria, E. christi, Eriogaster catax, Euphydryas aurinia, Graellsia isabellae, Hypodryas maturna, Lycaena dispar, Maculinea nausithous, M. teleius, Melanagria arge, Papilio hospiton, Plebicula golgus
the praying mantis Apteromantis aptera
the dragonflies Coenagrion hylas, C. mercuriale, Cordulegaster trinacriae, Gomphus graslinii, Leucorrhina pectoralis, Lindenia tetraphylla, Macromia splendens, Ophiogomphus cecilia, Oxygastra curtisii
the grasshopper Baetica ustulata

Molluscs
Gastropods (snails): Caseolus calculus, C. commixta, C. sphaerula, Discula leacockiana, D. tabellata, Discus defloratus, D. guerinianus, Elona quimperiana, Geomalacus maculosus, Geomitra moniziana, Idiomela subplicata (as Helix subplicata), Leiostyla abbreviata, L. cassida, L. corneocostata, L. gibba, L. lamellosa, Vertigo angustior, V. genesii, V. geyeri, V. moulinsiana
Bivalves: Margaritifera margaritifera and Unio crassus

Plants
Mosses and liverworts: Bruchia vogesiaca, Buxbaumia viridis, Dichelyma capillaceum, Dicranum viride, Distichophyllum carinatum, Drepanocladus vernicosus, Jungermannia handelii, Mannia triandra, Meesia longiseta, Nothothylas orbicularis, Orthotrichum rogeri, Petalophyllum ralfsii, Riccia breidleri, Riella helicophylla, Scapania massolongi, Sphagnum pylaisii, Tayloria rudolphiana

Ferns and allies
the ferns Asplenium jahandiezii, Culcita macrocarpa, Trichomanes speciosum and Woodwardia radicans
the water ferns Marsilea batardae, M. quadrifolia and M. strigosa
Botrychium simplex and Ophioglossum polyphyllum
the squillworts Isoetes boryana and I. malinverniana

Monocots
Alismataceae: Caldesia parnassifolia and Luronium natans
Allium grosii
Eleocharis carniolica
Juncus valvatus
Hyacinthoides vicentina
Leucojum nicaeense
Daffodils: Narcissus asturiensis, N. calcicola, N. cyclamineus, N. fernandesii, N. humilis, N. pseudonarcissus subsp. nobilis, N. scaberulus, N. triandrus subsp. capax and N. viridiflorus
Grasses: Avenula hackelii, Bromus grossus, Coleanthus subtilis, Festuca brigantina, F. duriotagana, F. elegans, F. henriquesii, F. sumilusitanica, Gaudinia hispanica, Holcus setiglumis subsp. duriensis, Micropyropsis tuberosa. Pseudarrhenatherum pallens and Puccinellia pungens
Orchids: Cypripedium calceolus and Liparis loeselii
Cretan date palm (Phoenix theophrasti)

Dicots
Apiaceae: Angelica palustris, Apium repens, Athamanta cortiana, Eryngium alpinum, Petagnia saniculifolia, Rouya polygama and Thorella verticillatinundata
Aldrovanda vesiculosa
Asteraceae: Centaurea corymbosa, C. gadorensis, C. kartschiana, Centaurea micrantha subsp. herminii, C. pulvinata, C. rothmalerana, C. vicentina, Crepis granatensis, Erigeron frigidus, Hymenostemma pseudanthemis, Leontodon microcephalus, L. boryi, Leuzea longifolia, Ligularia sibirica, Santolina impressa, S. semidentata and Senecio nevadensis
Boraginaceae: Myosotis lusitanica, M. rehsteineri, M. retusifolia, Omphalodes kuzinskyana and Solenanthus albanicus
Brassicaceae: Alyssum pyrenaicum, Arabis sadina, Biscutella vincentina,  Boleum asperum, Brassica glabrescens, B. insularis, Coincya cintrana, Diplotaxis ibicensis, D. vicentina, Erucastrum palustre, Iberis procumbens subsp. microcarpa, Ionopsidium savianum, Sisymbrium cavanillesianum and S. supinum
Campanulaceae: Asyneuma giganteum, Jasione crispa subsp. serpentinica and J. lusitanica
Caryophyllaceae: Arenaria provincialis, Dianthus cintranus subsp. cintranus, D. marizii, D. rupicola, Herniaria algarvica, H. berlengiana, H. maritima, Moehringia tommasinii, Petrocoptis grandiflora, P. montsicciana, P. pseudoviscosa, Silene cintrana, S. hifacensis, S. longicilia and S. mariana
Centranthus trinervis
Cistaceae: Cistus palhinhae, Halimium verticillatum, Helianthemum alypoides and H. caput-felis
Daphne petraea
Erodium paularense
Euphorbia transtagana
Fabaceae: Anthyllis hystrix, Astragalus centralpinus, A. tremolsianus, Genista dorycnifolia, G. holopetala, Melilotus segetalis subsp. fallax and Trifolium saxatile
Gentianaceae: Gentiana ligustica and Gentianella angelica
Lamiaceae: Dracocephalum austriacum, Nepeta dirphya, Origanum dictamnus, Sideritis incana subsp. glauca, S. javalambrensis, S. serrata, Teucrium lepicephalum, T. turredanum and Thymus carnosus
Malvaceae: Kosteletzkya pentacarpos
Najas flexilis
Paeoniaceae: Paeonia cambessedesii, P. parnassica and P. clusii subsp. rhodia
Pinguicula nevadensis
Plantago algarbiensis and P. almogravensis
Plumbaginaceae: Armeria berlengensis, A. negleta, A. pseudarmeria, A. soleirolii, A. velutina, Limonium dodartii subsp. lusitanicum, L. lanceolatum and L. multiflorum
Polygonaceae: Polygonum praelongum and Rumex rupestris  
Primulaceae: Androsace mathildae, A. pyrenaica, Primula palinuri and Soldanella villosa
Ranunculaceae: Adonis distorta, Aquilegia bertolonii, [[Aquilegia kitaibelii|A. kitaibelii]] and Pulsatilla patens
Rosaceae: Potentilla delphinensis
Saxifragaceae: Saxifraga berica, S. florulenta, S. hirculus and S. tombeanensis
Scrophulariaceae: Antirrhinum charidemi, Chaenorrhinum serpyllifolium subsp. lusitanicum, Euphrasia marchesettii, Linaria algarviana, L. coutinhoi, L. flava, L. tonzigii, Odontites granatensis, Verbascum litigiosum and Veronica micrantha
Thesium ebracteatum
Viola jaubertiana
Willow: Salix salviifolia subsp. australis
Zelkova abelicea

Priority species
There are also a number of priority species:

Animals
Dutch tundra vole (Microtus oeconomus arenicola)
Wolf (Canis lupus): Spanish populations: only those south of the Duero; Greek populations: only those south of the 39th parallel)
Brown bear
Iberian lynx
Monk seal (Monachus monachus)
Corsican red deer (Cervus elaphus corsicanus)
Pyrenean ibex (Capra pyrenaica pyrenaica)
Apennine chamois (Rupicarpa ornata)
Loggerhead sea turtle (Caretta caretta)
the lizard Gallotia simonyi
the viper Vipera schweizeri
Fire salamander (Salamandra salamandra aurorae)
Majorcan midwife toad (Alytes muletensis)
the frog Pelobates fuscus insubricus
the sturgeons Acipenser naccarii and Acipenser sturio
the fish Valencia hispanica
some of the anadromous populations in certain sectors of the North Sea of Coregonus oxyrhynchus
the cyprid fish Ladigesocypris ghigii
the beetles Carabus olympiae, Osmoderma eremita and Rosalia alpina
the butterfly Euplagia quadripunctaria (under the synonym Callimorpha quadripunctata)

Plants
the fern Dryopteris corleyi
the moss Bryoerythrophyllum machadoanum
the liverwort Marsupella profunda
the spruce Abies nebrodensis

Androcymbium rechingeri 
Asphodelus bento-rainhae
Muscari gussonei
the daffodil Narcissus nevadensis
Carex panormitana
Dioscorea chouardii (as Borderea chouardii)
Grasses: Stipa austroitalica, S. bavarica and S. veneta
Orchids: Cephalanthera cucullata and Ophrys lunulata

Apiaceae: Angelica heterocarpa, Apium bermejoi, Bupleurum capillare, B. kakiskalae, Eryngium viviparum, Laserpitium longiradium, Naufraga balearica, Oenanthe conioides and Seseli intricatum
Asteraceae: Anthemis glaberrima, Artemisia granatensis, Aster pyrenaeus, A. sorrentinii, Carduus myriacanthus, Centaurea alba subsp. heldreichii and subsp. princeps, C. attica subsp. megarensis, C. balearica, C. borjae, C. citricolor, C. horrida, C. kalambakensis, C. lactiflora, C. niederi, C. peucedanifolia, C. pinnata, Crepis crocifolia, Jurinea cyanoides, J. fontqueri, Lamyropsis microcephala, Leontodon siculus and Senecio elodes
Atropa baetica
Bassia saxicola
Boraginaceae: Anchusa crispa, Lithodora nitida, Omphalodes littoralis and Symphytum cycladense
Brassicaceae: Biscutella neustriaca, Brassica macrocarpa, Coincya rupestris, Coronopus navasii, Diplotaxis siettiana, Iberis arbuscula and Ionopsidium acaule
Campanula sabatia
Caryophyllaceae: Arenaria nevadensis, Gypsophila papillosa, Herniaria latifolia subsp. litardierei, Silene hicesiae, S. holzmanii, S. orphanidis, S. rothmaleri and S. velutina
Convolvulaceae: Convolvulus argyrothamnus and C. fernandesii
Cistaceae: Tuberaria major
Daphne rodriguezii
Euphorbia margalidiana
Fabaceae: Astragalus algarbiensis, A. aquilanus, A. maritimus, A. verrucosus, Cytisus aeolicus, Ononis hackelii and Vicia bifoliolata
Gentianaceae: Centaurium rigualii and C. somedanum
Geraniaceae: Erodium astragaloides and E. rupicola
Euphorbia margalidiana
Hypericum aciferum
Lamiaceae: Micromeria taygetea, Nepeta sphaciotica, Thymus camphoratus and T. cephalotos
Linum muelleri
Lythrum flexuosum
Plumbaginaceae: Armeria helodes, A. rouyana, Limonium insulare, L. pseudolaetum and L. strictissimum
Primulaceae: Primula apennina
Ranunculaceae: Aconitum corsicum, Aquilegia pyrenaica subsp. cazorlensis, Consolida samia and Ranunculus weyleri
Reseda decursiva
Ribes sardum a currant from Saridnia 
Rubiaceae: Galium litorale and G. viridiflorum
Salicornia veneta
Scrophulariaceae: Euphrasia genargentea, Globularia stygia, Linaria ficalhoana, L. hellenica, L. ricardoi, L. tursica and Veronica oetaea
Viola hispida

Macaronesia
There is a separate list for plants from Macaronesia.
Isoestes azorica
Marsilea azorica
Carex malato-belizii
Grasses: Deschampsia maderensis, Phalaris maderensis
Scilla maderensis
Semele maderensis
Orchids: Goodyera macrophylla

Apiaceae: Ammi trifoliatum, Bupleurum handiense, Chaerophyllum azoricum, Ferula latipinna, Melanoselinum decipiens, Monizia edulis, Oenanthe divaricata and Sanicula azorica
Arceuthobium azoricum
Asteraceae: Andryala crithmifolia, Argyranthemum thalassophylum. A. winterii, Atractylis preauxiana, Calendula maderensis, Cheirolophus duranii, Ch. ghomerytus, Ch. junonianus, Ch. massonianus, Cirsium latifolium, Helichrysum gossypinum, H. oligocephala, Phagnalon benettii, Stemmacantha cynaroides and Sventenia bupleuroides
Beta patula
Caralluma burchardii
Boraginaceae: Echium candicans, Myosotis azorica and M. maritima
Brassicaceae: Crambe laevigata and Sinapidendron rupestre
Campanulaceae: Musschia aurea
Cistaceae: Cistus chinamadensis
Crassulaceae: Aeonium gomeraense, A. saundersii, Aichryson dumosum, Monanthes wildpretii and Sedum brissemoretii
Caryophyllaceae: Spergularia azorica
Erica azorica
Euphorbia lambii and E. stygiana
Fabaceae: Anthyllis lemanniana, Lotus callis-viridis and Vicia dennesiana
Frangula azorica
Kunkeliella subsucculenta
Lamiaceae: Sideritis infernalis, S. marmorea, Teucrium abutiloides and T. betonicum
Maytenus umbellata
Oleaceae: Jasminum azoricum and Picconia azorica
Plantago malato-belizii
Plumbaginaceae: Limonium dendroides
Rumex azoricus
Rosaceae: Bencomia sphaerocarpa, Dendriopterium pulidoi, Marcetella maderensis, Prunus lusitanica subsp. azorica and Sorbus maderensis
Scabiosa nitens
Scrophulariaceae: Euphrasia grandiflora, Isoplexis isabelliana, Odontites holliana and Sibthorpia peregrina
Viola paradoxa

Macaronesian priority species
Mosses: Echinodium spinosum and Thamnobryum fernandesii
Androcymbium psammophilum

Asteraceae: Argyranthemum lidii, Atractylis arbuscula, Lactuca watsoniana, Onopordum nogalesii, O. carduelinum, Pericallis hadrosoma and Tanacetum ptarmiciflorum
Boraginaceae: Echium gentianoides
Brassicaceae: Crambe arborea, C. sventenii and Parolinia schizogynoides
Campanulaceae: Azorina vidalii and Musschia wollastonii
Ceropegia chrysantha
Cistaceae: Helianthemum bystropogophyllum
Convolvulaceae: Convolvulus caput-medusae, C. lopez-socasii and C. massonii
Euphorbia handiensis
Fabaceae: Anagyris latifolia, Dorycnium spectabile, Lotus azoricus, Lotus kunkelii, Teline rosmarinifolia and T. salsoloides
Geranium maderense
Lamiaceae: Sideritis cystosiphon and S. discolor
Myrica rivas-martinezii
Pittosporum coriaceum
Plumbaginaceae: Limonium arborescens, L. spectabile and L. sventenii
Rosaceae: Bencomia brachystachya and Chamaemeles coriacea
Sambucus palmensis
Solanum lidii
Scrophulariaceae: Euphrasia azorica, Globularia ascanii, G. sarcophylla and Isoplexis chalcantha

Annex III
This annex explains the criteria which are used to select sites which are eligible to be recognised as important for Europe, or as Special Areas of Conservation. The process consists of two stages. The first stage is to assess the importance at a national level, based on the habitats and species listed in Annex I and II. The second stage is to assess the importance for Europe as a whole, again based on the two earlier annexes.

Annex IV
Annex IV lists species of interest to Europe which are in need of strict protection.

Mammals
Insectivores: Pyrenean desman (Galemys pyrenaicus), Erinaceus algirus and Crocidura canariensis
All species of Microchiroptera
Rodents: Beaver (Castor fiber), Cricetus cricetus, porcupine (Hystrix cristata), Sicista betulina, suslik (Citellus citellus), Sciurus anomalus, Microtus cabrerae, Dutch tundra vole (Microtus oeconomus arenicola), and all species of Gliridae except Glis glis and Eliomys quercinus 
Carnivores: Grey wolf (except Spanish populations north of the Duero and Greek populations north of the 39th parallel), brown bear (Ursus arctos), otter {Lutra lutra}, Mustela lutreola, wild cat (Felis silvestris), lynx (Lynx lynx), Iberian lynx (Lynx pardinus) and monk seal (Monachus monachus)
Hoofed animals: Corsican red deer (Cervus elaphus corsicanus), natural populations of wild goats (Capra aegagrus), natural populations of wild sheep (Ovis ammon musimon) on Corsica and Sardinia, Balcan (Rupicapra rupicapra balcanica) and Apennine chamois (R. ornata)
Cetaceans: All species

Reptiles and amphibians
Turtles
Tortoises: Testudo hermanni, T. graeca and T. marginata
Sea turtles: Caretta caretta, Chelonia mydas, Lepidochelys kempii, Eretmochelys imbricata and Dermochelys coriacea
Freshwater turtles: Emys orbicularis, Mauremys caspica and M. leprosa

Lizards
Algyroides fitzingeri, A. marchi, A. moreoticus and A. nigropunctatus
Chamaeleo chamaeleon
Gallotia atlantica, G. galloti (including specifically the subspecies insulanagae), G. simonyi and G. stehlini
Geckoes: Cyrtopodion kotschyi, Phyllodactylus europaeus, Tarentola angustimentalis, T. boettgeri, T. delalandii and T. gomerensis.
Lacerta agilis, L. bedriagae, L. danfordi, L. dugesi, L. graeca, L. horvathi, L. monticola, L. schreiberi, L. trilineata and L. viridis
Ophisaurus apodus
Ophisops elegans
Podarcis erhardii, P. filfolensis, Podarcis hispanica atrata, P. lilfordi, P. melisellensis, P. milensis, P. muralis, P. peloponnesiaca, P. pityusensis, P. sicula, P. taurica, P. tiliguerta and P. wagleriana
Skinks: Ablepharus kitaibelli, Chalcides bedriagai, Ch. occidentalis, Ch. ocellatus, Ch. sexlineatus, Ch. viridianus and Ophiomorus punctatissimus
Stellio stellio

Snakes
Coluber caspius, C. hippocrepis, C. jugularis, C. laurenti, C. najadum, C. nummifer and C. viridiflavus
Coronella austriaca
Eirenis modesta
Elaphe longissima, E. quatuorlineata and E. situla
Eryx jaculus
Natrix natrix cetti, N. natrix corsa and N. tessellata
Telescopus falax
Vipera ammodytes, V. schweizeri, V. seoanni (except Spanish populations), V. ursinii and V. xanthina

Salamanders:
Chioglossa lusitanica
Euproctus asper, E. montanus and E. platycephalus
Olm (Proteus anguinus)
Salamandra atra, S. salamandra aurorae, S. lanzai and S. luschani
Salamandrina terdigitata
Speleomantes ambrosii, S. flavus, S. genei, S. imperialis, S. italicus and S. supramontes
Triturus carnifex, T. cristatus, T. italicus, T. karelinii and T. marmoratus

Toads and frogs:
Alytes cisternasii, A. muletensis and A. obstetricans
Bombina bombina and B. variegata
Bufo calamita and B. viridis
Discoglossus galganoi, D. jeanneae, D. montalentii, D. pictus and D. sardus
Treefrogs: Hyla arborea, H. meridionalis and H. sarda
Pelobates cultripes, P. fuscus and P. syriacus
Rana arvalis, R. dalmatina, R. graeca, R. iberica, R. latastei and R. lessonae

Fish
Perches: Zingel asper
Sturgeons: Acipenser naccarii and A. sturio
Coregonus oxyrhynchus (anadromous populations in certain sectors of the North Sea)
Valencia hispanica

Insects
Beetles: Buprestis splendens, Carabus olympiae, Cerambyx cerdo, Cucujus cinnaberinus, Dytiscus latissimus, Graphoderus bilineatus, Osmoderma eremita and Rosalia alpina
Dragonflies: Aeshna viridis, Cordulegaster trinacriae, Gomphus graslinii, Leucorrhina albifrons, L. caudalis, L. pectoralis, Lindenia tetraphylla, Macromia splendens, Ophiogomphus cecilia, Oxygastra curtisii, Stylurus flavipes and Sympecma braueri
Grasshoppers: Baetica ustulata and Saga pedo
Lepidoptera: Apatura metis, Coenonympha hero, C. oedippus, Erebia calcaria, E. christi, E. sudetica, Eriogaster catax, Fabriciana elisa, Hypodryas maturna, Hyles hippophaes, Lopinga achine, Lycaena dispar, Maculinea arion, M. nausithous, M. teleius, M. arge, Papilio alexanor, P. hospiton, Parnassius apollo, P. mnemosyne, Plebicula golgus, Proserpinus proserpina and Zerynthia polyxena
Mantids: Apteromantis aptera

Spiders
Macrothele calpeiana

Molluscs
Gastropods (snails): Patella feruginea, Caseolus calculus, C. commixta, C. sphaerula, Discula leacockiana, D. tabellata, D. testudinalis, D. turricula, Discus defloratus, D. guerinianus, Elona quimperiana, Geomalacus maculosus, Geomitra moniziana, Helix subplicata, Leiostyla abbreviata, L. cassida, L. corneocostata, L. gibba and L. lamellosa
Bivalves: Lithophaga lithophaga, Pinna nobilis, Margaritifera auricularia and Unio crassus

Echinoderms
Centrostephanus longispinus

Plants
Annex IV contains all the plant species listed in Annex II (except the mosses and lichens), plus the plant taxa listed below:
Ferns: Asplenium hemionitis
Dracaena draco
Iridaceae: Crocus etruscus, Iris boissieri and I. marisca
Liliaceae: Androcymbium europeum, Bellevalia hackelli, Colchicum corsicum, C. cousturieri, Fritillaria conica, F. drenovskii, F. gussichiae, F. obliqua, F. rhodocanakis, Ornithogalum reverchonii, Scilla beirana and S. odorata
Narcissus longispathus and N. triandrus
Orchids: Ophrys argolica, Orchis scopulorum and Spiranthes aestivalis

Apiaceae: Bunium brevifolium
Aquilegia alpina
Asteraceae: Argyranthemum pinnatifidum subsp. succulentum, Helichrysum sibthorpii, Picris willkommii, Santolina elegans, Senecio caespitosus, S. lagascanus subsp. lusitanicus and Wagenitzia lancifolia
Berberis maderensis
Campanula morettiana and Physoplexis comosa
Euphorbia nevadensis
Gesneriads: Ramonda heldreichii (as Jankaea heldreichii) and Ramonda serbica
Lamiaceae: Rosmarinus tomentosus, Teucrium charidemi, Thymus capitellatus and T. villosus subsp. villosus
Mandragora officinarum
Moehringia fontqueri
Murbeckiella sousae
Primulaceae: Androsace cylindrica, Primula glaucescens and P. spectabilis
Saxifraga cintrana, S. portosanctana, S. presolanensis, S. valdensis and S. vayredana
Scrophulariaceae: Antirrhinum lopesianum and Lindernia procumbens
Sideroxylon marmulano
Thymelaea broterana
Viola athois, V. cazorlensis and V. delphinanth

Annex V
Annex V details the species which are of 'interest' to the European Union, of which the taking or exploitation of wild may be subject to the management decisions of the individual countries concerned. This largely concerns plants or animals in which the hunting or gathering was/is an economic activity.
Mammals
Carnivores: golden jackal (Canis aureus moreoticus), Spanish populations north of the Duera and Greek populations north of the 39th parallel of the grey wolf, Martes martes, Mustela putorius, all species of Phocidae (seals) not mentioned in Annex IV, Genetta genetta and Herpestes ichneumon
Mountain hare (Lepus timidus)
Hoofed mammals: Capra ibex, C. pyrenaica (except C. pyrenaica pyrenaica) and Rupicapra rupicapra (except R. rupicapra balcanica and R. ornata)

Amphibians
Rana esculenta, R. perezi, R. ridibunda and R. temporaria

Fish
Lampreys: Lampetra fluviatilis and Lethenteron zanandrai
All sturgeon species not mentioned in Annex IV
Salmonidae: Thymallus thymallus, Hucho hucho, Salmo salar (only when in fresh water) and all Coregonus spp. (except Coregonus oxyrhynchus - anadromous populations in certain sectors of the North Sea)
Cyprinids: all Barbus spp.
Perciformes: Gymnocephalus schraetzer and Zingel zingel
All Alosa spp.
Catfish: Silurus aristotelis

Other
Corals: Corallium rubrum
Molluscs: Helix pomatia, Margaritifera margaritifera, Microcondylaea compressa and Unio elongatulus
Hirudo medicinalis
Crabs: Astacus astacus, Austropotamobius pallipes and A. torrentium
Lobster: Scyllarides latus
Moth: Graellsia isabellae

Plants
Red algae: Lithothamnium coralloides and Phymatholithon calcareum
Lichens: Cladonia subgenus Cladina
Mosses: Leucobryum glaucum, all Sphagnum species except Sphagnum pylasii
Clubmosses: all Lycopodium spp. (see lycopodium powder)

Galanthus nivalis, Narcissus bulbocodium and N. juncifolius
Iris lusitanica
Lilium rubrum
Ruscus aculeatus

Asteraceae: Arnica montana, Artemisia eriantha, A. genipi, Doronicum plantagineum subsp. tournefortii and Leuzea rhaponticoides
Brassicaceae: Alyssum pintadasilvae, Malcolmia lacera subsp. graccilima and Murbeckiella pinnatifida subsp. herminii
Gentianaceae: Gentiana lutea
Lamiaceae: Teucrium salviastrum subsp. salviastrum
Fabaceae: Anthyllis lusitanica, Dorycnium pentaphyllum subsp. transmontana and Ulex densus
Plumbaginaceae: Armeria sampaio
Rosaceae: Rubus genevieri subsp. herminii
Scrophulariaceae: Anarrhinum longipedicelatum, Euphrasia mendonçae, Scrophularia grandiflora subsp. grandiflora, S. berminii and S. sublyrata

Annex VI
This annex compiles the types of capture and killing (i.e. hunting) which are prohibited in the European Community (and now the European Union), as well as prohibited modes of transport (while hunting). These can vary according to form of life. Birds are covered by the older Birds Directive.
Mammals, for example, may not be hunted using explosives, gassing or smoking out burrows, poisons and poisoned or anaesthetic bait, tape recorders, artificial light sources, mirrors and other dazzling devices, blind or mutilated animals used as live decoys, non-selective nets or traps, crossbows and semi-automatic or automatic machine guns with a magazine capable of holding more than two rounds of ammunition. Other prohibited hunting devices are those to illuminate targets, electrical and/or electronic devices capable of killing or stunning and sighting scopes for night shooting with an electronic image magnifier or image converter.
Fish may not be caught using poisons or explosives.

It is furthermore illegal to hunt wildlife in the European Union from an aircraft or moving motor vehicle.

See also

List of European Union directives
Conservation movement
Environmental protection
Environmentalism
Lagoon

References

External links
The Habitats Directive online at the EU's website
Convention on the Conservation of European Wildlife and Natural Habitats, Bern (1982)
The Habitats Directive by Keulen, M. van (2002)

European Union directives
European Union and the environment
Environmental conservation
Environmental law in the European Union
1992 in law
1992 in the environment
1992 in the European Economic Community